The 1936 USC Trojans football team represented the University of Southern California (USC) in the 1936 college football season. In their 12th year under head coach Howard Jones, the Trojans compiled a 4–2–3 record (3–2–2 against conference opponents), finished in third place in the Pacific Coast Conference, and outscored their opponents by a combined total of 129 to 65.

Schedule

References

USC
USC Trojans football seasons
USC Trojans football